Rules Changed Up is the debut studio album by Polish recording artist Piotr Lisiecki. It was released by EMI Music on 27 April 2011. One week later, it placed eighth in Polish official sales chart.

Track listing 
Track listing taken from official album booklet.
 "Cała moja"
 "Gra o wszystko"
 "Skazani na siebie"
 "Ikar płonie"
 "To miasto jest złe"
 "Każda chwila sprawia radość"
 "Tam gdzie cichną rozmowy"
 "Lost" (Anouk's cover)
 "Ain't no sunshine" (Withers' cover)
 "Jolene" (Parton's cover)

References 

2011 albums
EMI Records albums